Steve Fulmer (born 6 May 1966) is an Australian former professional rugby league footballer who played in the 1980s and 1990s. He played for the Newcastle Knights from 1988 to 1991.

External links
http://www.rugbyleagueproject.org/players/Steve_Fulmer/summary.html

Australian rugby league players
Newcastle Knights players
Living people
Place of birth missing (living people)
1966 births
Rugby articles needing expert attention
Rugby league halfbacks
20th-century Australian people